Super Junior-K.R.Y. The 1st Concert is the first concert tour and sixth international tour by South Korean boy band Super Junior sub group, Super Junior-K.R.Y. The Asia tour commenced with two shows in Tokyo from 1 to 2 August 2010 and hit a total of 12 concerts This concert gathering over 22,000 fans. Super Junior members Donghae, Sungmin, and Heechul along with label-mate  Shinee and TRAX appeared as guests in the Seoul Concert.

Setlist

Tour dates

Personnel
 Artists: Super Junior-K.R.Y.: Yesung, Ryeowook and Kyuhyun
 Tour organizer: SM Entertainment
 Tour promoter: Dream Maker Entercom

References

External links 
 Super Junior official website 

2010 concert tours
2011 concert tours
Super Junior-K.R.Y concert tours